Dr. Joseph Moreau is the American author of Schoolbook Nation, a book detailing the conflict over the teaching of American history from the Civil War onward. He is currently a history teacher at Abraham Joshua Heschel High School in New York City.

Moreau was born and raised in Dover, New Hampshire. He attended the University of New Hampshire for his undergraduate degree, and later received his Ph.D. in American Culture from the University of Michigan. Moreau formerly taught history at Trinity High School in New York.

References

21st-century American historians
21st-century American male writers
Historians of the United States
Schoolteachers from New York (state)
Living people
Year of birth missing (living people)
University of Michigan alumni
American male non-fiction writers